Michelle Muscat ( Tanti; born 16 May 1974) is the wife of the former Prime Minister of Malta, Joseph Muscat.

Biography 
Michelle Muscat married Joseph Muscat in 2001. She is alleged to be involved in Panama-based letterbox companies in a network of political-business connections of her husband. After Muscat's election in 2013, employees of Brian Tonna created the letterbox company Egrant Inc. in Panama. In April 2017, journalist Daphne Caruana Galizia suggested that shares in Egrant Inc. were held by Mossack Fonseca nominees for Michelle Muscat. In December 2019, an inquiry was published, which investigated if the Panama company Egrant Inc. was owned by the prime minister, his wife or his family. The investigation found no evidence to support the claim made by Caruana Galizia.

The couple have twin children born in 2007.

Honours 
 2015: Order of Merit of the Federal Republic of Germany (Großes Bundesverdienstkreuz mit Stern und Schulterband)
 2017: National Volunteer of the year, Malta Council for Voluntary Work
 2018: Order of Merit of the Italian Republic

References 

1975 births
Living people
People from Rabat, Malta
2019 Malta political crisis
Grand Crosses with Star and Sash of the Order of Merit of the Federal Republic of Germany